Events from the year 1728 in Scotland.

Incumbents 

 Secretary of State for Scotland: vacant

Law officers 
 Lord Advocate – Duncan Forbes
 Solicitor General for Scotland – John Sinclair, jointly with Charles Erskine

Judiciary 
 Lord President of the Court of Session – Lord North Berwick
 Lord Justice General – Lord Ilay
 Lord Justice Clerk – Lord Grange

Events 
 13 May – 3 men and 8 boys from Hirta are retrieved from Stac an Armin where they have been accidentally marooned for about 9 months, the longest recorded period anyone has spent on the sea stack.
 31 May – The Royal Bank of Scotland extends the first overdraft (to Edinburgh merchant William Hogg for £1,000).
 Iron smelting at Invergarry begins.
 Inverness – Fort William road through the Great Glen completed.
 First larch trees in Scotland planted at Dunkeld.
 First publication of Robert Lindsay of Pitscottie's The Historie and Chronicles of Scotland, 1436–1565, written about 1575 in the Scots language.

Births 
 13 February – John Hunter, surgeon (died 1793)
 16 April – Joseph Black, physicist and chemist (born in France; died 1799)
 3 July – Robert Adam, architect (died 1792)

Deaths 
 3 April – James Anderson, lawyer, antiquary and historian (born 1662)

See also 

 Timeline of Scottish history

References 

 
Years of the 18th century in Scotland
Scotland
1720s in Scotland